The Aviatik D.VI was a German prototype single-seater fighter aircraft of the First World War, designed by Aviatik.

Design
The D.VI was a two-bay biplane of wooden construction with ply-covered fuselage and fabric-covered wings and tail surfaces. Armament comprised two synchronised  LMG 08/15 Spandau machine guns and power was provided by a geared Benz Bz.IIIbm.

Development
The D.VI was intended to participate in the second D-type Contest held at Adlershof in June 1918, but, owing to problems with the reduction gear of the Bz.IIIbm, it was too late to participate in this contest, and by the time type-testing had revealed excellent flight characteristics, the D.VI had already been overtaken by the D.VII.

Specifications

References

1910s German fighter aircraft
D.VI
Aircraft first flown in 1918